John Graham David Smith (21 August 1950 – 12 October 2012) was an English cricketer.  Smith was a right-handed batsman who bowled left-arm medium pace.  He was born in Stockton-on-Tees, County Durham.

Smith made his debut for Durham against Northumberland in 1982 MCCA Knockout Trophy.  He played Minor counties cricket for Durham in 1982 and 1983, making 6 Minor Counties Championship appearances.  He made his only List A appearance against Surrey in the 1982 NatWest Trophy.  He scored 3 runs in the match, before being dismissed by Kevin Mackintosh. Graham Smith died of cancer on Friday 12 October 2012.

References

External links
Graham Smith at ESPNcricinfo
Graham Smith at CricketArchive

1950 births
2012 deaths
Cricketers from Stockton-on-Tees
English cricketers
Durham cricketers
Cricketers from Yorkshire